The Maebong Line is an electrified standard-gauge freight-only secondary line of the Korean State Railway in South P'yŏngan Province, North Korea, running from Haksan on the Ŭnsan Line to Maebong.

Route
A yellow background in the "Distance" box indicates that section of the line is not electrified.

References

Railway lines in North Korea
Standard gauge railways in North Korea